The Helsinki tram network forms part of the Helsinki public transport system organised by Helsinki Regional Transport Authority and operated by Metropolitan Area Transport Ltd (Finnish: Pääkaupunkiseudun Kaupunkiliikenne Oy, Swedish: Huvudstadsregionens Stadstrafik Ab) in the Finnish capital city of Helsinki. The trams are the main means of transport in the city centre. 56.7 million trips were made in 2013. The Helsinki system is one of the oldest electrified tram networks in the world.

Lines

Additional lines 
In addition to the 10 regular lines two special ones exist: the museum line operated by Helsinki City Transport in collaboration with Oy Stadin Ratikat Ab and the Spårakoff pub tram, both of which run during the summer months. These lines do not appear in the route map included with this article.

Technology and infrastructure
The tram network is built almost exclusively on the streets of Helsinki, making it a traditional tram system rather than light rail. The track gauge is one metre. The network consists almost entirely of double track rail. In some parts the tracks are separated from other road traffic; elsewhere they share road space with cars and buses.

The trams are powered with electricity conveyed by overhead wires. Trams have their own traffic lights, distinguished from normal lights in that they are based on symbols of single colour: an upward-pointing arrow signifies "go", a horizontal line "prepare to stop" and the letter S "stop". The traffic lights are synchronised to allow tram and bus traffic to flow relatively smoothly. This system is called HeLMi (Helsinki Public Transport Signal Priority and Passenger Information).

Depots

As of 2020, there are three HKL-maintained tram depots/workshops in Helsinki; Töölö, Vallila and Koskela.

 The Töölö depot houses trams running on lines 2-5 and 10. The Helsinki tram museum is located next to the Töölö depot. Between 1948 and 1974 the Töölö depot also housed the trolleybuses used on Helsinki's sole trolleybus line.
 The Vallila depot houses repair-, paint- and rebuilding facilities, and administrative functions.
 The Koskela depot is the largest tram depot in Helsinki. It houses approximately two thirds of trams in the city, and contains training facilities. The Koskela depot is linked to the main Helsinki tram network by a long section of double track that is seldom used by passenger-serving trams.

Planning process is under way (as of December 2020) for a new tram depot in Ruskeasuo region next to current bus depot and to reconstruct the Koskela depot. There were plans earlier to excavate an underground tram depot in the base rock below the existing Vallila depot and adjacent city blocks, but this was calculated to be too expensive.

Rolling stock

As of December 2020, HKL has up to 122 tram units that can be used in scheduled passenger service. Additionally, there are trams in reserve and in charter use. The MLNRV I and II series (rebuilt Valmet Nr I and Valmet Nr II units), and Transtech Artic series comprise the current backbone of the fleet.

In 2006-2011, all Valmet Nr II (at that point known as NRV II) vehicles underwent a major modification process in which a  low-floor midsection was added to the tram. The type designation was changed to MLNRV II to reflect the modifications made, and the longer trams were re-introduced in traffic gradually as the modification works were completed. During the process, HKLalso rebuilt ten of the older Nr I trams (at that point known as NRV II) in the same way, which brought the total number of MLNRV trams to 52 upon completion in mid-2014.

The fully low-floor Variotram units, acquired in 1998–2003 from Adtranz (later Bombardier) and built by Transtech Oy in Otanmäki, proved to be unreliable, causing a shortage of operable trams. Starting in 2004, HKL purchased ten Duewag series second-hand trams from Mannheim in Germany to cover for the shortage. Eventually arrangements were made with Bombardier to keep a sufficient number of the units in operation. All of the Duewag units were either withdrawn or relegated to charter service by the end of 2014. All Variotrams were taken out of use in 2018 because of the problems. 

Beginning in 2013, HKL acquired 72 new Artic-trams. The design has a 100% low floor and conventional, turning bogies designed to run without problems on Helsinki's challenging old-fashioned track network. Two prototype units were delivered in 2013, and each entered passenger service approximately two months after delivery. The first unit of the production series, no. 403, arrived in Helsinki in January 2016. The order is worth €113 million and it includes an option for a further 90 trams.

To ease the construction of new tram tracks into Jätkäsaari beginning in 2009, HKL considered using bi-directional trams on the new line. However, HKL decided to build the Jätkäsaari extensions with conventional return loops and to use the existing uni-directional rolling stock.

The following table lists the current rolling stock. Corresponding articles have further details about the cars in use.

History

Planned extension of the network

See also 
 Helsinki Metro
 Trams in Finland
 Tampere light rail

References

Bibliography 
Helsinki City Transport

 
 
 

Finnish Tramway Society

 
 

Helsingin Sanomat

 

Miscellaneous

External links 

 Helsinki City Transport official website
 Track plan of the Helsinki tram system
 Raide-Jokeri (Official website)

Transport in Helsinki
Tram transport in Finland
Metre gauge railways in Finland
600 V DC railway electrification
Town tramway systems by city